MŠK Kráľová pri Senci is a Slovak football team, based in the town of Kráľová pri Senci.

External links 
www.mskkralova.sk 
at kralovaprisenci.sk

References

Kralova pri Senci
Sport in Bratislava Region